Ricau de Tarascon (also spelled Ricautz or Ricavi) was a Provençal knight and troubadour from Tarascon, active between 1200 and 1240. He served Count Raymond Berengar V of Provence as an administrator.

His vida portrays him as a good "servant" of ladies. He wrote both sirventes and cansos, but only two songs survive. "Ab tan de sen cum Deus m'a dat", a canso, is accepted by scholars to be his and is generally ascribed to him in the chansonniers, although it is also ascribed to Gui de Cavalhon and Aimeric de Peguillan. Ricau knew Gui personally, since together they composed a tenso (debate poem), "Cabrit, al mieu vejaire", in which Gui is called "Cabrit". The tenso is jocular in tone. Its poetic structure is borrowed from a song of Perdigon's that was also reused by Joan Esteve.

Notes

Sources
Egan, Margarita, trans. (1984). The Vidas of the Troubadours. New York: Garland. .
Guida, Saverio. (1987). "La tenzone fra Ricau de Tarascon e ‘Cabrit’." Cultura Neolatina, 47, pp. 197–221. Re-published in Miscellanea di studi in onore di Aurelio Roncaglia a cinquant’anni dalla sua laurea (Modena, 1989), pp. 637–661.

External links

Guida, Saverio. (2003). "Premessa all’edizione in linea della tenzone fra Ricau de Tarascon e Gui de Cavaillon (422.2 = 105.1)." 
Guida, Saverio. (2007). Premessa all’edizione in linea della tenzone fra Ricau de Tarascon e Gui de Cavaillon (422.2 = 105.1). 
Guida, Saverio, ed. (1989). Cabrit, al mieu vejaire 

13th-century French troubadours
Year of death unknown
Year of birth unknown
People from Tarascon